The 2015 Boston Pizza Cup was held from February 4 to 8 at the Peace Memorial Multiplex in Wainwright, Alberta. The winning Kevin Koe team represented Alberta at the 2015 Tim Hortons Brier in Calgary.

Qualification process
Twelve teams qualified for the provincial tournament through several methods. The qualification process is as follows:

Notes
  The defending champion usually receives the first berth, and in the case that the defending champion declines or is not eligible to receive the berth, the runner-up receives the berth. The defending champion from 2014, Kevin Koe, won the 2014 Tim Hortons Brier and, under the revised format implemented for the 2015 Brier, would have been eligible for automatic entry with his 2014 team in the 2015 Brier as Team Canada, which would have negated any need for him to compete in the Boston Pizza Cup. However, Koe assembled a new team in the off-season, rendering him ineligible for both the national and provincial berths. Had they not been eligible to compete as Team Canada, Koe's former teammates and their new skip John Morris would have received automatic entry into the 2015 Boston Pizza Cup. Meanwhile, the 2014 Albertan runner-up, Kevin Martin, retired in the off-season. Therefore, the first berth went to the highest ranked eligible team as of April.

Teams

Knockout Draw Brackets

A event

B event

C event

Knockout results

Draw 1
Wednesday, February 4, 9:30 am

Draw 2
Wednesday, February 4, 6:30 pm

Draw 3
Thursday, February 5, 9:00 am

Draw 4
Thursday, February 5, 2:00 pm

Draw 5
Thursday, February 5, 6:30 pm

Draw 6
Friday, February 6, 9:00 am

Draw 7
Friday, February 6, 2:00 pm

Draw 8
Friday, February 6, 6:30 pm

Draw 9
Saturday, February 7, 1:00 pm

Playoffs

A vs. B
Saturday, February 7, 6:30 pm

C1 vs. C2
Saturday, February 7, 6:30 pm

Semifinal
Sunday, February 8, 9:00 am

Final
Sunday, February 8, 2:00 pm

References

External links

Curling in Alberta
Boston Pizza Cup
Boston Pizza Cup
Municipal District of Wainwright No. 61
February 2015 sports events in Canada